Rabalderstræde Forever is a compilation album by Danish rock group Gasolin' and was released in 1991 on CD and as a double LP.

It was a big seller in Denmark and a new generation of Danes discovered why Gasolin' was so popular in the first place. It was also released in 1999 as Gasolin' Forever with Derudaf Forever.

Track list

 "Langebro" (from their debut album)
 "På banen" (from Gasolin' 2)
 "Det var Inga, Katinka og Smukke Charlie på sin Harley" (from Gasolin' 3)
 "Se din by fra tårnets top" (from Gasolin' 2)
 "Kap Farvel til Umanarssuaq" (from Stakkels Jim)
 "Rabalderstræde" (from Gas 5)
 "Kvinde min" (from Gas 5)
 "Pilli Villi" (from Efter endnu en dag)
 "Stakkels Jim" (from Stakkels Jim)
 "Længes hjem" (from Gør det noget)
 "Sirenesangen" (from Efter endnu en dag)
 "Kloden drejer stille rundt" (Efter endnu en dag)
 "Pas på svinget i Solrød" (Efter endnu en dag)
 "Uh-Lu-La-Lu" (non album track)
 "Masser af succes" (from Gas 5)
 "Get On The Train" (from Gør det noget)
 "Strengelegen" (from Gør det noget)
 "Hva' gør vi nu, lille du" (from Live sådan)
 "Jumbo nummer nul" (from Gør det noget)
 "Det bedste til mig og mine venner" (from Gør det noget)
 "Som et strejf af en dråbe" (non album track)

Credits

Gasolin'

Franz Beckerlee - guitar, moog, e-bow, vocals
Wili Jønsson - bass, vocals, piano
Kim Larsen - vocals, guitar, piano
Søren Berlev - drums, vocals

References

Gasolin' compilation albums
1991 compilation albums
Columbia Records compilation albums